Brychius is a genus of beetles in the family Haliplidae, containing the following species:

 Brychius elevatus (Panzer, 1793)
 Brychius glabratus (Villa & Villa, 1835)
 Brychius hornii Crotch, 1873
 Brychius hungerfordi Spangler, 1954
 Brychius pacificus Carr, 1928

References

Haliplidae
Beetles described in 1859